Taman Bunga Merdeka (literally meaning Independent Flower Park) originally known as the Coronation Park is a public park in Malacca City, Malacca, Malaysia. Located along Jalan Kota and facing the People's Museum and other museums, it is one of few parks in the city center. It was built by the British in 1953 and named to memorialise the coronation of Queen Elizabeth II, when the park still fronted on the sea (landfill has removed its seafront since then).  The park is part of a UNESCO World Heritage-recognized historic district, the Historic Cities of the Straits of Malacca listing.

Attractions
The park includes the "Transportation area" of the People's Museum, which was established in collaboration with Malayan Railway, the Royal Malaysian Air Force and the West Malaysia Department of Civil Aviation. It contains a number of historic transportation artifacts, such as:

a propeller-driven Scottish Aviation Twin Pioneer CC Mk 1 aircraft, the "Lang Rajawali", which was the first aircraft acquired by the Royal Malayan Airforce after it was founded in 1962,
a diesel locomotive named Sungai Lukut 21111, which was built in Japan in 1965, and an accompanying vintage railway carriage,
a vintage yellow fire engine,
replica bullock cart.

The park includes foundation stones of a Portuguese- and Dutch-built bastion in the city walls of Malacca, which was eventually demolished by the British.

The term "Melaka Transportation Museum" was also used for a museum that was opened in the outlying Ayer Keroh area of Melaka, in 2010, which was eventually closed; the outdoor transportation museum of the downtown park survives.

Former museum of same name

The Transportation Museum was a museum located separately, in a suburban part of Melaka.

The museum was opened on 15 April 2010 with a cost of MYR198,900.  The museum exhibited various types of vehicles, ranging from cars, motorcycles, bicycles etc.  The museum was opened daily except Monday, first day of Eid al-Fitr and Eid al-Adha.

Gallery

See also
 List of museums in Malaysia
 List of tourist attractions in Malacca

References

Parks in Malaysia
Museums in Malacca
2010 establishments in Malaysia
2015 disestablishments in Malaysia